Each national team has to submit a squad of 18 players, two of whom must be goalkeepers.

Players in boldface have been capped at full international level since the tournament.

Ages are as of the start of the tournament, 2 July 2017.

Group A

Georgia
Head coach: Georgi Kipiani

Czech Republic
Head coach: Jan Suchopárek

Sweden
On 16 June 2017, Sweden named their squad. On 28 June 2017, defender Dennis Hadžikadunić, midfielder Mattias Svanberg and midfielder Svante Ingelsson left the squad, being replaced by Anel Ahmedhodžić, Teddy Bergqvist and Joseph Ceesay.

Head coach: Claes Eriksson

Portugal
On 25 June 2017, Portugal announced their final squad. On 28 June, Madi Queta replaced injured José Gomes.

Head coach: Hélio Sousa

Group B

Germany
On 25 June 2017, Germany announced their final squad. Maxime Awoudja replaced Salih Özcan. 

Head coach: Frank Kramer

England
Head coach: Keith Downing

Bulgaria
On 21 June 2017, Bulgaria announced their final squad. 

Head coach: Angel Stoykov

Netherlands
On 22 June 2017, the Netherlands named their squad.

Head coach: Maarten Stekelenburg

Notes

References

2017 UEFA European Under-19 Championship
UEFA European Under-19 Championship squads